Moonsund Regatta is a sailing competition that takes place on Väinameri (Moonsund) in Estonia.

First Regatta took place in 1958.

In 2017, there was 60. Regatta, and this Regatta was the biggest of Moonsund Regattas: 850 sailors with 144 yachts, and sailors from five countries (Estonia, Latvia, Lithuania, Finland and Russia).

In popular culture
 films
 1974 – Moonsund Regatta, 15 minutes in ETV
 1994 – 38. Moonsund Regatta, in RTV and Lucky Strike
 1996 – Moonsund Regatta, 40 minutes, directed by Jaanus Nõgisto

References

External links
 

Sailing in Estonia
Sports competitions in Estonia